Loukas Yorkas born in Aradippou, Cyprus, on 18 October 1986, is a Cypriot singer and the winner of the first season of the Greek version of the television talent series The X Factor. In September 2009 he released his first EP album, Mazi, which attained gold certification. He studies Biology at the University of Patras. Loukas Yorkas represented Greece in the Eurovision Song Contest 2011 in Germany along with Stereo Mike, with the song "Watch My Dance", placing seventh with 120 points.

Career

2008 - 2009: The X Factor

The path in the show:
Live 1 - "Eho Mia Agapi"
Live 2 - "Runaway"
Live 3 - "Agapi Ti Diskolo Pragma"
Live 4 - "S' Anazito Sti Saloniki"
Live 5 - "Bang Bang"
Live 6 - "Gia To Kalo Mou"
Live 7 - "I Balanta Tou Kir Mentiou"
Live 8 - "Instabile"
Live 9 - "Erotiko"
Live 10 - "Baby Don't Let Me Be Misunderstood"
Live 11 - "San Planodio Tsirko" (First Song)
Live 11 - "Party" (Second Song)
Live 12 - "Didimotiho Blues" (First Song)
Live 12 - "Agriolouloudo" (Second Song)
Final: "Ladadika" (first song), "Piretos", (second song), "Party" (final song)

2010–present

On 11 January 2011, Greece's Hellenic Broadcasting Corporation (ERT) announced that Loukas Yorkas was one of six participants in a national final to select Greece's entry in the Eurovision Song Contest 2011. After winning the national final, Yorkas appeared at Eurovision where he placed 7th with 120 points.

Discography

EPs
 2009: Mazi

Singles
 2010: "Tha Peso, Tha Sikotho"
 2011: "Watch My Dance" (feat. Stereo Mike)
 2011: "Gia Proti Fora"
 2012: "Ematha"
 2013: "Eklapsa"
 2014: "Mia Akoma Voutia"
 2015: "Stin Ousia"
 2017: "De Pao Sti Douleia"
 2017: "Stoihima"
 2018: "Ypokrinesai"
 2019: "Ela Ilie Mou" (feat. Kostas Tournas)
 2020: "Mona Liza"
 2020: "Pame Ap' Tin Arxi"
 2021: "Mou Eleipses Poly"
 2021: "Gia Tin Ellada"
 2022: "An M' Agapas"

References

1986 births
The X Factor winners
Living people
Eurovision Song Contest entrants of 2011
Eurovision Song Contest entrants for Greece
University of Patras alumni
Cypriot expatriates in Greece
People from Larnaca District
Modern Greek-language singers